Symphyotrichum patens, commonly known as late purple aster or spreading aster, is a perennial, herbaceous plant found in the eastern United States.

Description
It has a spreading growth form, and the leaves are ovate to oblong and clasp the pubescent stem. It flowers between August and October.

Taxonomy
The title of a review of the Symphyotrichum patens complex begins with "Another review..." as a nod to the complexity of the topic. The species was first formally described and named Aster patens by Swedish botanist Jonas Carlsson Dryander and published by Scottish botanist William Aiton in 1789. It was transferred to the genus Symphyotrichum in 1995 by American botanist Guy L. Nesom. It is closely related to Symphyotrichum georgianum and Symphyotrichum phlogifolium.

Several varieties have been named, with the basionym as Symphyotrichum patens var. patens:
Symphyotrichum patens var. gracile (Hook.) G.L.Nesom
Symphyotrichum patens var. patentissimum (Lindl.) G.L.Nesom
Symphyotrichum patens var. terranigrum J.J.N.Campb. & W.R.Seymour

Distribution and habitat
A widely distributed species, S. patens ranges from southern Maine, south and west to eastern Texas. Plants are typically found in sunny to mostly sunny sites, including open woodlands.

Conservation
, NatureServe listed Symphyotrichum patens as Secure (G5) worldwide and Possibly Extirpated (SX) in Maine.

Citations

References

patens
Endemic flora of the United States
Flora of the United States
Plants described in 1789
Taxa named by William Aiton